In computer science, a stable sorting algorithm preserves the order of records with equal keys.
 In numerical analysis, a numerically stable algorithm avoids magnifying small errors. An algorithm is stable if the result produced is relatively insensitive to perturbations during computation.

See also 
 Stable (disambiguation)
 Stability (disambiguation)